Jordy Buijs (born 28 December 1988, in Ridderkerk) is a Dutch professional footballer who plays as a centre back for Fagiano Okayama. He can also play as a midfielder.

Buijs is a player with a great ability to read the game and who is steady in passing. He joined Feyenoord's youth squad in 1995. He participated with the Netherlands under 17 squad at the 2005 under 17 European Championships, where the Dutch reached the final. Buijs provided the assist for the winning goal in the semi final against Italy. He also took part with the same team at the Under 17 World Championships in Peru where they became third. Dutch under 17 coach Ruud Kaiser said Jordy Buijs is a winners type, who is good in one on one clashes, who has a great heading ability and an absolute peach of a free-kick on him.

Career

Feyenoord
In July 2007 Buijs became officially part of Feyenoord's first team managed by Bert van Marwijk. He was awarded squad number 23. But, after having no chances on the first team, he was loaned to De Graafschap for a half-year period, on 30 January 2008.

De Graafschap
In his first period at De Graafschap he didn't play that much. In the second half of the 2007/2008 season he only played in 6 Eredivisie games for De Graafschap. Although he didn't play a lot of games De Graafschap decided to sign Jordy Buijs. In the beginning of the 2008/2009 season Buijs still wasn't a first eleven player. But during the season Buijs became important player. He played on the left back position but also on the midfield. He scored his first goal for De Graafschap in the home game versus Sparta Rotterdam. He scored the 3–1. Unfortunately the game ended in a 3–3 draw. He played in 28 games in the Eredivisie in the 2008/2009 season. He also scored a beautiful free kick in the play-off match versus MVV Maastricht. Jordy Buijs became a fan favorite and is well known with his rushes down the leftflank and his clever passes.

NAC Breda
In the summer of 2011, Buijs signed a three-year contract with NAC and became an important player for the team. He again played both as a centre back and a defensive midfielder. After three seasons, Buijs left as a free agent as he claimed to be ready for a new challenge

SC Heerenveen
Buijs found this new challenge with SC Heerenveen and signed a two-year contract, having denied offers from ADO Den Haag, FC Groningen and Panathinaikos. However, he left them after half a season by mutual consent for Roda JC. In summer 2016 he moved abroad to play for Romanian side Pandurii Târgu Jiu.

Sydney FC
On 13 January 2017, Buijs signed with A-League club Sydney FC on a 5 month contract, with an option for an extra year. He made his debut for the club in its annual 'Big Blue' Australia Day derby clash against Melbourne Victory helping his team to a 2–1 win at Etihad Stadium.

On the 29 April 2017, Buijs scored his first goal for Sydney FC, in a 3–0 win over Perth Glory in the A-League finals series. The goal was the first ever to be reviewed by the video assistant referee (VAR).

The Dutchman re-signed with Sydney FC for another year on May 15, 2017.

On 1 August 2017, Buijs scored his second goal for Sydney FC, in the 2017 FFA Cup Round of 32 against Darwin Rovers FC in a record 8–0 victory. In the Quarter Final, Buijs scored a free-kick against Melbourne City in a 2–0 victory. On 9 May 2018, Jordy Buijs was released by Sydney FC.

On 10 July 2018, it was announced that he would join V-Varen Nagasaki on and one and a half year contract.

Honours

Club
De Graafschap
 Eerste Divisie: 2009–10

Sydney FC
A-League Premiership: 2016–2017, 2017–2018
A-League Championship: 2016–2017
FFA Cup: 2017

Albirex Niigata
J2 League : 2022

Individual
J2 Monthly MVP : August 2022
J2 League Best XI: 2022

References

External links
 
 
 Voetbal International profile 
 Feyenoord Forever 
 Jordy Buijs Interview

1988 births
Living people
Footballers from Ridderkerk
Association football central defenders
Association football midfielders
Dutch footballers
Feyenoord players
De Graafschap players
NAC Breda players
SC Heerenveen players
Roda JC Kerkrade players
CS Pandurii Târgu Jiu players
Sydney FC players
V-Varen Nagasaki players
Tokushima Vortis players
Kyoto Sanga FC players
Fagiano Okayama players
Eredivisie players
Eerste Divisie players
Liga I players
A-League Men players
J1 League players
J2 League players
Dutch expatriate footballers
Expatriate footballers in Romania
Expatriate soccer players in Australia
Expatriate footballers in Japan
Dutch expatriate sportspeople in Romania
Dutch expatriate sportspeople in Australia
Dutch expatriate sportspeople in Japan